Kopsia is a genus of plant in family Apocynaceae first described as a genus in 1823. Kopsia is native to China, Southeast Asia, Australia, and various islands of the western Pacific.

Species

Note: 
 Kopsia angustipetala Kerr - Thailand, Laos
 Kopsia arborea Blume - S China, SE Asia, N Australia, Andaman & Nicobar Is
 Kopsia dasyrachis Ridl. - Sabah
 Kopsia deverrei L.Allorge - Johor
 Kopsia flavida Blume - Philippines, Maluku, New Guinea, Solomon Is, Vanuatu, Micronesia
 Kopsia fruticosa (Roxb.) A.DC. - Myanmar, Andaman Is
 Kopsia grandifolia D.J.Middleton - Johor, Anambas Is
 Kopsia griffithii King & Gamble - W Malaysia
 Kopsia hainanensis Tsiang - Hainan 
 Kopsia harmandiana Pierre ex Pit. - Vietnam
 Kopsia lapidilecta Sleesen - Natuna Is
 Kopsia larutensis King & Gamble - W Malaysia
 Kopsia macrophylla Hook.f. - W Malaysia
 Kopsia pauciflora Hook.f. - Indochina, W Malaysia, Sumatra
 Kopsia profunda King & Gamble - W Malaysia
 Kopsia rajangensis D.J.Middleton - Sarawak
 Kopsia rosea D.J.Middleton - S Thailand, Kelantan
 Kopsia singapurensis Ridl. - Singapore, W Malaysia
 Kopsia sleesiana Markgraf - Sarawak
 Kopsia sumatrana D.J.Middleton - Sumatra
 Kopsia tenuis Leenh. & Steenis - Sarawak
 Kopsia teoi L.Allorge - W Malaysia
 Kopsia tonkinensis Pit. - Vietnam
 Kopsia vidalii D.J.Middleton - Vietnam

References

D. J. Middleton: A revision of Kopsia (Apocynaceae: Rauvolfioideae). In: Harvard Papers in Botany. 9, 2004, S. 89-142.
P.-T. Li, A.J.M. Leeuwenberg, D.J. Middleton: Apocynaceae. In: Flora of China. Vol. 16. Missouri Botanical Garden Press, 1995, S. 143-188. . 
T. Sévenet, L. Allorge, B. David, K. Awanga, A. Hamid A. Hadi, C. Kan-Fan, J.-C. Quirion, F. Remy, H. Schaller, L.E. Teo: A preliminary chemotaxonomic review of Kupsia (Apocynaceae). Journal of Ethnophamacology, Band 41, 1994, S. 147-183. 
M.E. Endress, P. V. Bruyns: A revised classification of the Apocynaceae s.l. Bot. Rev. 66, 2000, S. 1-56. 
K. Potgieter, V.A. Albert: Phylogenetic relationships within Apocynaceae s.l. based on trnL intron and trnL-F spacer sequences and propagule characters. Ann. Miss. Bot. Gard. 88, 2001, S. 523-549. 
<li>B. Sennblad, B. Bremer: Classification of Apocynaceae s.l. according to a new approach combining Linnaean and phylogenetic taxonomy. Syst. Biol. 51(3), 2002, S. 389-409. (PDF) 
Middleton D.J. 2004: A revision of Kopsia (Apocynaceae: Rauvolfioideae). Harvard Pap. Bot. 9: 89-142. 
D.J. Middleton: A new species of Kopsia (Apocynaceae, Rauvolfioideae) from Vietnam. Adansonia 27, 2005, S. 287-289. - (PDF)

External links

 
Medicinal plants
Apocynaceae genera
Taxonomy articles created by Polbot